Varvara Nikolaevna Yakovleva (19 December 1885 – 11 September 1941) was a prominent Bolshevik party member and Soviet government official who later supported Leon Trotsky's attempt to democratize the party. She was sentenced to 20 years in prison in 1938 for membership in a "diversionary terrorist organization." She was later shot in the Oryol Central Prison.

Early life
Yakovleva was born to the middle-class family of a tradesman of Jewish descent 1885 in Moscow. Her father was a convert to Orthodox Christianity. She joined the Bolsheviks in January 1904, aged 18, as a student at a women's college in Moscow, where she was studying mathematics and physics, and was immediately involved in the illegal distribution of party literature. During the 1905 Revolution, she was violently assaulted on the breasts, which damaged her health, and was a cause of the tuberculosis that she later contracted in exile in Siberia. She was first arrested in 1906, and again in 1907, and barred from living in Moscow. Arrested again in December 1910, she was sentenced to four years exile in Narym, in Siberia, but escaped, and emigrated to Berlin to get medical treatment. She returned via Cracow, where she met Vladimir Lenin and made arrangements to smuggle illegal literature and correspondence across the border. In October 1912, as an agent of the Central Committee in Moscow, but was arrested for the fourth time in 1913, and sent back to Narym, but escaped again, to St Petersburg, where she was soon arrested and deported to Astrakhan.

Career post-1917 
Yakovleva was able to return to Moscow late in 1916, and was appointed secretary of the Moscow regional committee of the Bolshevik party. In August 1917, she was elected a candidate for membership in the Bolshevik Central Committee, making her the third most prominent woman Bolshevik, after Alexandra Kollontai and Yelena Stasova. She took notes at the meeting that set the date for the October Revolution of 1917, and took a leading part in organising the takeover of power in Moscow. In December 1917, she appointed a member of the collegium of the NKVD,  but a month later was transferred to economic work as head of Vesenka.

In February 1918, Yakovleva supported the Left Communists, led by Nikolai Bukharin, who opposed the Treaty of Brest-Litovsk, which ended the war between Russia and Germany at the cost of leaving most of Ukraine and the Baltic states under German occupation. She returned to work in June, and in September 1918 was appointed deputy head of the Petrograd (St Petersburg) Cheka. This was during the Red Terror that followed an attempt on Lenin's life, and the assassination of the former head of the Petrograd Cheka, Moisei Uritsky. From January 1919, as a board member of the People's Commissariat of Food, she led food inspections and parties that requisitioned food as a punitive measure. She was known for her severity in this matter. In March 1920, Yakovleva again backed Bukharin against Lenin during a dispute over the role of the trade unions.

In December 1920-April 1921, she was secretary of the Moscow organisation. In April–August 1921, she was secretary of the Siberian party organisation. In 1922, she was appointed to a senior role in the RFSFR People's Commissariat for Education.

In 1923, Yakovleva signaled her continued support for the left opposition by signing the Declaration of the 46, but afterwards she severed contact with the opposition. In December 1929, she was appointed RFSFR People's Commissar for Finance.

Family 
Yakovleva's younger brother, Nikolai (1886-1918) also joined the Bolsheviks in 1904–05, and is reputed to have been arrested 12 times over a decade. In 1914–16, he was in exile in Narym. According to Lenin's widow, he was a "staunch and reliable Bolshevik". In 1916, he was conscripted into the Imperial Army, and stationed in Tomsk, where he was elected Chairman of the Tomsk Soviet after the February Revolution. In February, he was appointed chairman of the Central Executive of the Siberian soviets, but was forced into hiding when soviet collapsed in Siberia. In November 1918, he was one of a group of Bolsheviks captured by White guards and killed on the spot.

Yakovleva's first husband was Pavel Shternberg, whom she converted to Bolshevism.

In 1921, she married Ivan Smirnov, but this marriage dissolved when she broke with the left opposition. Their daughter, Vladlena, fled Moscow after her parents' arrests, to avoid being placed in an orphanage, and later worked as a teacher in Siberia. She married Dmitri Zolnikov, a lecturer at Novosibirsk State University. Their daughter, Natalya Zolnikova (1949-2018), was one of the foremost historians of the Russian Orthodox Church.

Imprisonment and death
Yakovleva was arrested on 12 September 1937. Following the Third Moscow Trial, in March 1938, she appeared as a witness, to testify that in 1918, Bukharin and other Left Communists had plotted to arrest and possibly assassinate Lenin, Stalin and Yakov Sverdlov. Bukharin, who was on trial, accused her of talking "patent nonsense". According to the historian Roy Medvedev, her 'evidence' was "a fraudulent deposition written for her by the investigators." Afterwards, she asked her cellmates to spread the word - if they survived - that the deposition was lies that she had been forced to sign. 
At a secret trial on 14 May 1938, she was convicted of sabotage and terrorism, and sentenced to 20 years in prison. She was held in solitary confinement Oryol Prison, where she was executed, together with all other inmates, three months after the German invasion of the USSR. The order to kill her was signed by Stalin. (Soviet sources later inaccurately gave her date of death as 1944).

She was posthumously rehabilitated in 1958.

Notes

1880s births
1941 deaths
Old Bolsheviks
NKVD officers
Russian Social Democratic Labour Party members
Russian Constituent Assembly members
Soviet politicians
Soviet rehabilitations
Great Purge victims from Russia
Russian people executed by the Soviet Union
Politicians from Moscow
Soviet women in politics
20th-century Russian women politicians
Russian Jews
Jews executed by the Soviet Union